The Sacramento Shakespeare Festival is an annual Shakespeare festival produced by City Theatre at Sacramento City College in Sacramento, California, United States.

References

External links
 Sacramento Shakespeare Festival

Shakespeare festivals in the United States
Theatre companies in California